"I Ejaculate Fire" is a song by death metal band Dethklok, taken from Dethalbum III. A digital download single was released on September 4, 2012. The song first premiered in the Metalocalypse episode "Dethhealth", and was later re-recorded in studio for the album.

A music video for "I Ejaculate Fire", directed by Mark Brooks, was released on September 10, 2012.

The song was nominated for "Song of the Year" during the 2013 Golden God Awards, but did not win.

Personnel

Virtual personnel from Metalocalypse
Nathan Explosion – lead vocals
Pickles – drums
Skwisgaar Skwigelf – lead guitar
Toki Wartooth – rhythm guitar
William Murderface – bass guitar

Actual personnel
Brendon Small – vocals, guitar, keyboards, production
Gene Hoglan – drums
Bryan Beller – bass guitar

Production
 Ulrich Wild – production, engineering

References

2012 singles
Metalocalypse
Dethklok songs
2012 songs